Strangalia is a genus of beetles in the family Cerambycidae, containing the following species:

 
 Strangalia acuminata (Olivier, 1795)
 Strangalia albicollis (Pascoe, 1860)
 Strangalia anneae Chemsak & Linsley, 1981
 Strangalia antennata Schaeffer, 1908
 Strangalia attenuata) (Linnaeus, 1758
 Strangalia auripilis Chemsak, 1969
 Strangalia baluensis Fisher 1935
 Strangalia beierli Giesbert, 1997
 Strangalia beltii (Bates, 1872)
 Strangalia benitoespinali Chalumeau, 1985
 Strangalia biannulata (Linsley, 1935)
 Strangalia bicolor (Swederus, 1787)
 Strangalia bicolorella Chemsak, 1969
 Strangalia bilineaticollis (Pic, 1915)
 Strangalia bivittata (Bates, 1870)
 Strangalia bonfilsi Villiers, 1979
 Strangalia brachialis (Bates, 1885)
 Strangalia cambrei Linsley & Chemsak, 1976
 Strangalia cantharidis (Chemsak & Linsley, 1976)
 Strangalia cavaventra Chemsak, 1969
 Strangalia cavei Chemsak & Linsley, 1981
 Strangalia chemsaki (Giesbert, 1997)
 Strangalia conicollis (Aurivillius, 1910)
 Strangalia debroizei Chalumeau & Touroult, 2005
 Strangalia dolicops Chemsak, 1969
 Strangalia doyeni Chemsak & Linsley, 1976
 Strangalia eickworti Chemsak & Noguera, 1997
 Strangalia elegans Giesbert, 1997
 Strangalia emaciata (Bates, 1880)
 Strangalia famelica Newman, 1841
 Strangalia flavocincta (Thomson, 1860)
 Strangalia flavocincta (Thomson, 1860)
 Strangalia fortunei Pascoe 1858
 Strangalia fujitai Shimomura 1994
 Strangalia gerdiana Holzschuh 2008
 Strangalia giesberti Gutierrez & Noguera 2020
 Strangalia gracilis Gressitt 1935
 Strangalia guindoni Giesbert, 1989
 Strangalia hamatipes Giesbert, 1986
 Strangalia hondurae Chemsak & Linsley, 1979
 Strangalia hovorei Giesbert, 1997
 Strangalia ianswifti Hovore & Chemsak, 2005
 Strangalia instabilis Giesbert, 1985
 Strangalia insularis (Fisher, 1932)
 Strangalia koyaensis Matsushita 1933
 Strangalia kunaia (Giesbert, 1997)
 Strangalia lachrymans (Bates, 1885)
 Strangalia lapidicina Giesbert, 1997
 Strangalia linsleyana (Giesbert, 1986)
 Strangalia linsleyi Gressitt 1951
 Strangalia lourdesae Nearns & Swift 2019
 Strangalia lunai Santos-Silva, Van Roie & Jocque 2021
 Strangalia luteicornis (Fabricius, 1775)
 Strangalia lyrata (Redtenbacher, 1867)
 Strangalia mediolineata Pic 1954)
 Strangalia melampus (Bates, 1885)
 Strangalia melanophthisis (Berg, 1889)
 Strangalia melanostoma (Bates, 1870)
 Strangalia melanura (Redtenbacher, 1867)
 Strangalia montivaga Chemsak & Linsley, 1976
 Strangalia monzoni Giesbert, 1997
 Strangalia nigella (Bates, 1872)
 Strangalia occidentalis Linsley & Chemsak, 1976
 Strangalia ochroptera (Bates, 1870)
 Strangalia ohbayashii Vives 2009
 Strangalia opleri Chemsak & Linsley, 1976
 Strangalia palaspina Chemsak, 1969
 Strangalia pallifrons Giesbert, 1997
 Strangalia panama Di Iorio, 2002
 Strangalia panamensis Giesbert, 1985
 Strangalia pectoralis (Bates, 1885)
 Strangalia penrosei Hovore & Chemsak, 2005
 Strangalia picticornis (Bates, 1869)
 Strangalia pseudocantharidis Giesbert, 1985
 Strangalia rubiginosa (Gounelle, 1911)
 Strangalia rubricollis (Bates, 1870)
 Strangalia sallaei (Bates, 1885)
 Strangalia saltator (Bates, 1885)
 Strangalia semifulva (Bates, 1870)
 Strangalia sexalbonotata Pic 1955
 Strangalia sexnotata Haldeman, 1847
 Strangalia sexocellata Hovore & Chemsak, 2005
 Strangalia sinaloae Chemsak & Linsley, 1981
 Strangalia solitaria Haldeman 1847
 Strangalia splendida (Aurivillius, 1920)
 Strangalia strigosa Newman, 1841
 Strangalia suavis (Melzer, 1926)
 Strangalia succincta (Redtenbacher, 1867)
 Strangalia sumatrensis (Gahan, 1907)
 Strangalia takakuwai Vives 2009
 Strangalia takeuchii Matsushita & Tamanuki 1935
 Strangalia thoracica (Fleutiaux & Sallé, 1889)
 Strangalia turnbowi Hovore & Chemsak, 2005
 Strangalia veracruzana Hovore & Chemsak, 2005
 Strangalia virilis LeConte, 1873
 Strangalia westcotti Chemsak & Linsley, 1976
 Strangalia xanthomelaena Monne & Monne, 2005
 Strangalia xanthotela (Bates, 1892)
 Strangalia yoryinethae Nearns & Swift 2019
 Strangalia zacapensis Giesbert, 1997
 Strangalia zikani (Melzer, 1922)

References

Lepturinae